Fundulidae is the family of topminnows and North American killifishes.

Distribution
The 46 species are native to North America as far south as Yucatan, and to the islands of Bermuda and Cuba, occurring in both freshwater and marine environments.

Description
Most members of the family are small. While the giant killifish (Fundulus grandissimus) and northern studfish (Fundulus catenatus) can reach  in length, most species are under 10 cm in length.

The distinguishing characteristic of the family is the maxillary bone, which is twisted instead of being straight.

While many species of the Fundulidae are listed as not threatened, there are some that are listed as endangered because of their environment. Many common species of the Fundulidae live in North America such as the United States and Mexico. They live in different ecosystem such as costal marshes, lagoons, rivers, streams with high elevations with clear water, and muddy conditions at lower elevation. They are able to adapt to different conditions which is increasing their survival rate.

Genera
There are three genera in the family Fundulidae:

 Fundulus Lacepède 1803
 Leptolucania Myers, 1924
 Lucania Girard, 1859

References

 
Ray-finned fish families
Cyprinodontiformes
Fish of North America
Fish of the Caribbean
Taxa named by Albert Günther